Ray Wilson Hathaway (October 13, 1916 – February 11, 2015) was a Major League Baseball pitcher who appeared in four games for the Brooklyn Dodgers in 1945.

Hathaway was born in Greenville, Ohio in October 1916. He was one of many ballplayers who only appeared in the major leagues during World War II. He made his major league debut on April 20, 1945 in relief against the New York Giants at the Polo Grounds.  In his one major league start, the Dodgers lost to the Chicago Cubs at Wrigley Field, 5–3, on May 28, 1945. Season and career totals for 4 games include a 0–1 record, 1 start, no complete games, 3 games finished, and an ERA of 4.00 in 9 innings pitched.

He had a lengthy career as a minor league baseball manager following his playing days. He was inducted in the South Atlantic League Hall of Fame. Hathaway was the uncle of former major league pitcher Dave Burba.

At the time of his death in February 2015, he had been the second oldest former major league player still alive.  Ironically the only man he was behind in this distinction, Mike Sandlock, was a teammate and played in Hathaway's first major league game, and Hathaway's only career start batting 8th just ahead of Hathaway in that game.  This means Ray was never the oldest living player from his major league debut, or even the oldest living player to bat in the same inning as he had batted. (Sandlock batted before him in both of Ray's major league at bats.)

References

External links
 or Retrosheet
Obituary

1916 births
2015 deaths
Asheville Tourists managers
Asheville Tourists players
Baseball players from Ohio
Brooklyn Dodgers players
Columbus Pirates players
Dayton Wings players
Elmira Pioneers players
Gastonia Pirates players
Major League Baseball pitchers
Montreal Royals players
Newport News Dodgers players
People from Greenville, Ohio
Pine Bluff Judges players
Portland Beavers managers
Pueblo Dodgers players
Raleigh Cardinals players
Santa Barbara Dodgers players
Santa Barbara Saints players
Savannah Pirates players
Tri-City Braves players
Trois-Rivières Royals players
Zanesville Dodgers players